Merv Benton (born Mervyn Bonson, 12 August 1942) was an Australian pop singer from the mid-1960s. His most popular singles were "Baby Let's Play House" (1964), "I Got Burned", "Yield Not to Temptation", "Don't Destroy Me" (all in 1965) and "You've Got What it Takes" (1966). For the 1966 Go-Set pop poll he was listed third most popular male vocalist. Australian musicologist, Ian McFarlane, described him as, "the epitome of the good-looking, clean-cut pop idol." Late in 1966 Benton was diagnosed with laryngeal polyps, the resulting treatment and recovery curtailed his music career. He became a real estate agent, and later organised the building of child care centres both in Queensland (until 1990) and in Phoenix, Arizona after relocating there in 1991.

Biography 

Merv Benton was born as Mervyn Bonson on 12 August 1942, in Melbourne. He grew up with his parents Edward Bonson, a manufacturer and Rae Bonson ( Hadlow) and a sibling. Benton attended Preston High School and left to work as a trainee bank clerk. He took weekly singing lessons from Melbourne-based vocal teacher, Jack White.

Benton started his singing career in October 1960 after a friend, Graeme Howie, entered him into a local talent quest. Upon winning with his rendition of "Don't Leave Me This Way" he met artist manager and promoter, Brian de Courcy. De Courcy introduced Benton to instrumental pop group, the Ramrods, which were led by Ian B Allen. Benton's early performances with the Ramrods were at Whittlesea Hall and Preston Migrant Centre. He also sang in front of the Chessmen (see Johnny Chester) and the Strangers.

Early in 1964, while still working at the bank, Benton completed demo recordings with Chester producing for W&G Records. Session musicians were Mick Lynch on drums, Frank McMahon on bass guitar, Albert Stacpool on keyboards and his brother Les Stacpool on lead guitar (all members of the Chessmen). Also observing was local radio personality, Stan Rofe. From the sessions, W&G issued Benton's first single, his rendition of "Baby Let's Play House" in March 1964, also covered by Elvis Presley in 1955. Scarth Flett of The Australian Women's Weekly described Benton, "slim 5ft. 9½in., with brown hair and brown eyes, Merv is a newcomer to show business." With Rofe's promotion, the single was popular on Melbourne radio, where it reached No. 17 on the local charts. In June Benton, backed by the Strangers, issued "Nervous Breakdown", previously released by Eddie Cochran. He followed with a four-track extended play (EP), Merv Benton (September 1964) and a full-length studio album, Come on and Get Me (1964). By November of that year the artist had appeared on TV shows, Sing, Sing, Sing (four times) and In Melbourne Tonight (twice).

His sixth single, "I Got Burned" (May 1965), peaked at No. 13 in Melbourne and also charted in Adelaide and Brisbane. It is a cover of Ral Donner's 1963 single. For the recording he was backed by the Tamlas, which comprised former band-mate Allen on bass guitar (ex-the Ramrods, the Planets) with Eddie Chappell on drums (ex-Checkmates), Charlie Gauld on guitar (ex-the Thunderbirds) and Noel Watson on guitar (ex-Tridents). According to David Kent's back-dated Australian Chart Book 1940–1969 it reached No. 18, nationally. Soon after the Tamlas line-up was Chappell, Les Stacpool, Ron Gilbey on guitar and Dennis Tucker on bass guitar (ex-Rondells). Other popular 1965 singles were "Yield Not to Temptation" (August) (original by Bobby Bland, 1962) and "Don't Destroy Me" (October).

Benton's 11th single, "You've Got What It Takes", appeared in February 1966 and was popular in Melbourne. The singer started having, "a nagging throat problem." By August he was diagnosed with laryngeal polyps, which were surgically removed with his subsequent recovery expected to take over six months. In October of that year he was listed third most popular male vocalist on national teen pop newspaper, Go-Set pop poll. According to a contemporary newspaper, "[he] was advised to rest his voice for two months, but didn't because he 'didn't want to disappoint his fans'." De Courcy announced Benton's retirement in November 1966. The Canberra Times Garry Raffaele reviewed Benton's compilation album, The Best of Merv Benton (1966) in December. Raffaele observed, "If [his] throat has in fact given up, I doubt if the musical world will grieve over much... I would willingly let him slip back into the Limbo which has claimed so many Australian rock singers." Despite Benton's infirmity W&G Records continued to release his singles into 1967.

Australian musicologist, Ian McFarlane, observed Benton was "the epitome of the good-looking, clean-cut pop idol." His vocal problems persisted for about 18 months – "[he] never returned to full-time singing" – to resume working for a bank's public relations department. Benton relocated to Queensland in 1969 and became a real estate agent. Prior to relocating he had entered a Melbourne recording studio, backed by the Fendermen. Benton issued a country music album, Great Country Songs, in 1970 on W&G Records. Michael Foster of The Canberra Times, noticed, "[he] has the roughness o£ tone which marks Johnny Cash and the same sincerity of approach."

Former bandmate, Allen convinced Benton to record three vocal tracks for a five-track EP, Merv Benton with the Allstars (1986). The Allstars comprised Allen on bass guitar, Les Stacpool on guitar, Henry Bource on saxophone, Ron Chapman on drums and Murray Robertson on keyboards. As a real estate agent he began to manage the building of child care centres. Benton migrated to the United States in 1991, he settled near Phoenix, Arizona and worked as consultant-manager of an American child care centre chain. As from 2003 Benton is married with four children.

Discography

Albums 

 Come on and Get Me (1964) – W&G Records 
 Sounds Great (1965) – W&G Records 
 Best of Merv Benton (compilation, 1966) – W&G Records 
 Great Country Songs (Movin' On) (1970) – W&G Records 
 The Fabulous Merv Benson (compilation, 1984) – Raven Records

Extended plays 

 Merv Benton's Hits (September 1964) – W&G Records 
 Dollars and Dimes (May 1965) – W&G Records 
 Rockin' Hot (January 1966) – W&G Records 
 We Got Love (April 1966) – W&G Records 
 More Merv Benton (August 1966) – W&G Records 
 Merv Benton with the All Stars (1986) – Allstar Records

Singles

Recommended reading

References

External links 

 "16 year old 'Teen Princes' Miss Maria Aurora Pijuan, from the Philippines, won a 10 day trip to Australia. In Melbourne she meet Merv Benton and Miss Lynne Randell from the popular teenage television show Go, photograph by Cliff Bottomley, 1966, held at National Archives of Australia. Depicts (L to R): Lynne Randell, Maria Aurora Pijuan, Merv Benton at The Go!! Show studios, ATV-0, Melbourne.

1942 births
Living people
Australian pop singers
Musicians from Melbourne